Wink First Live Shining Star is a live album by Japanese idol duo Wink, released by Polystar on May 25, 1990. The album was recorded live at the duo's concert at the Miyagi Prefectural Auditorium in Sendai on January 20, 1990 and at the Iwata Citizens' Cultural Hall in Hamamatsu on January 22, 1990.

The album hit No. 1 on Oricon's albums chart and sold over 111,000 copies. It was also certified Gold by the RIAJ.

Track listing

Charts

Certification

References

External links 
 

1990 live albums
Wink (duo) albums
Japanese-language live albums